The Violin Concerto in A minor, BWV 1041, was composed by Johann Sebastian Bach. While it is "generally thought to have been composed at Köthen in 1717–23", Christoph Wolff has argued that the work may have been written in Leipzig during Bach's time as director of the Collegium Musicum; John Butt also believes that Bach wrote it "probably soon after taking over the Leipzig Collegium Musicum in 1729".  In any event, the only autograph source to survive are parts Bach copied out (along with other copyists) in Leipzig circa 1730  from a now lost score or draft.

Structure and analysis
The piece has three movements:

A typical performance of the concerto takes around 15 minutes.

Instrumentations and transcriptions
The Clavier Concerto in G minor, BWV 1058 is an arrangement of this concerto with harpsichord.

References

External links 
 Violin Concerto in A minor: performance by the Netherlands Bach Society (video and background information)
 

Concertos by Johann Sebastian Bach
Bach Violin Concerto in A minor
Compositions in A minor

de:Violinkonzerte (Bach)#Violinkonzert a-Moll BWV 1041